William Morley Kilbourn, CM, FRSC (1926–1995) was a Canadian author and historian in Toronto, Ontario.  Kilbourn's topics cover history, biography, religion and the arts, with a focus on Toronto; he penned over a dozen books.  He was married to the Rev. Elizabeth Kilbourn.

Born in Toronto, Ontario, Kilbourn was educated at Upper Canada College and the University of Trinity College in the University of Toronto.  Following this he completed degrees in modern history at Oxford and Harvard universities.  He later taught at McMaster University and Harvard.

Kilbourn served for five years as the first chairman of humanities at York University, seven years on the Toronto City Council, and as an alderman.  He was also founding chairman of the Toronto Art Therapy Institute and the Toronto Distress Centre, a member of the Toronto Historical Board, the boards of the Toronto General Hospital and Young People's Theatre, and served as chairman of the Toronto Arts Council.  Kilbourn was also a member of the executives of the Canada Council and the Canadian commission for UNESCO.

Kilbourn was elected to the Royal Society of Canada in 1980.

Works
 The Firebrand: William Lyon Mackenzie and the 1837 Rebellion; Clarke, Irwin, Toronto; 1956.
 Toronto Remembered: a Celebration of the City
 William Kilbourn,  "Introduction", "Tory Ontario", "Two Styles of Historian: Donald Creighton and Frank Underhill", and "Harol Town Talk", in Canada: A guide to the Peaceable Kingdom Toronto: Macmillan of Canada, 1970.

External links
 William Kilbourn fonds

References

William Kilbourn Ed., A Guide to the Peaceable Kingdom (Toronto: Macmillan, 1970), xi-xviii, 113-6,  274-9,315-9.

1926 births
1995 deaths
Canadian male non-fiction writers
Fellows of the Royal Society of Canada
Harvard University alumni
Harvard University faculty
Members of the Order of Canada
Toronto city councillors
Trinity College (Canada) alumni
University of Toronto alumni
Upper Canada College alumni
Writers from Toronto
20th-century Canadian historians